103rd Street–Washington Heights station is a commuter railroad station on Metra's Rock Island District line in the Washington Heights neighborhood of Chicago, Illinois,  from LaSalle Street Station, the northern terminus of the line. In Metra's zone-based fare system, 103rd Street–Washington Heights is in zone C. As of 2018, 103rd Street–Washington Heights is the 187th busiest of Metra's 236 non-downtown stations, with an average of 101 weekday boardings.

As of 2022, 103rd Street—Washington Heights is served by eight inbound trains and nine outbound trains on weekdays. It is served during peak hours only, although it does get served by some reverse peak trains.

The station is used only during rush hour. Parking is available from 104th Street and Throop Street off 105th Street, along the right of way of the former Pennsylvania Railroad "Panhandle Line." Bus connections are provided by the CTA.

Tracks 
There are two tracks at 103rd Street—Washington Heights. Trains from Chicago run on track 2 (the west track) and trains to Chicago run on track 1 (the east track.)

Bus connections
CTA
  9 Ashland 
  103 West 103rd 
  112 Vincennes/111th

References

External links

Station from 103rd Street from Google Maps Street View

Metra stations in Chicago